Jesse Thomas Curran (born 16 July 1996) is a professional footballer who plays for Thai League 1 club Chonburi, on loan from BG Pathum United. Born in Australia, he represents the Philippines national team. Curran is a versatile player who can play as a midfielder and also down the right flank either as a right winger or a right back.

He has previously played for Devonport City, Blacktown City, Central Coast Mariners, Dundee and on loan for Montrose and East Fife. After Dundee, Curran left Scotland to play in Thailand for Muangthong United, and on loan with Udon Thani and Nakhon Ratchasima. Now he come back to Thailand playing for BG Pathum United.

Early life
Curran was raised in Tasmania before moving to Sydney to attend Westfields Sports High School, aged sixteen. He is of Scottish heritage on his father's side and is of Filipino heritage on his mother's side.

Club career

Central Coast Mariners
Curran signed with Central Coast Mariners to play in the National Youth League in September 2013. He was an unused substitute for the senior side on one occasion, an A-League match against Adelaide United in October 2013. He received the club's National Youth League Player of the Year award in 2014.

Dundee
In March 2015, Curran trialled with Scottish Premiership club Dundee. He signed a two-year deal with the club shortly after. He made his senior debut for the club on 4October 2015, coming on as a first-half substitute for captain Kevin Thomson in a win over Motherwell.

Loan to Montrose
In November 2015, Curran joined Montrose on a one-month emergency loan deal, playing in three matches before returning to Dundee.

Loan to East Fife
In March 2017, he joined Scottish League One side East Fife on an emergency loan deal. He signed a new contract with Dundee after returning to the club in May 2017.

Curran signed a new one-year deal with Dundee in June 2018. In the 2018–19 season, he began to feature regularly in Dundee's starting eleven. He scored his first goal for the side in a 4–0 win over Hamilton Academical in December 2018.

He left Dundee in June 2019, his contract having expired.

Muangthong United
After a successful trial, Curran signed a deal with Thai side Muangthong United at the beginning of 2020.

Loan to Udon Thani
When Muangthong were unable to register him as an ASEAN player, he went on loan to Thai League 2 side Udon Thani on 7February 2020. He scored his first goal for the club on 21February against Navy FC. Curran was named in the Team of the Week after the following match against Sisaket, but he was sent off the next week against Phrae United. Upon the return of football in Thailand after the disruption caused by the COVID-19 pandemic, he scored in his next appearance against Customs United.

Loan to Nakhon Ratchasima
In December 2020, Curran left Udon Thani and joined Thai League 1 side Nakhon Ratchasima on loan from Muangthong. He made his debut for Korat the following week.

Curran was released from Muangthong at the end of 2021.

Kaya–Iloilo 
On 20 February 2022, Curran joined Philippines Football League side Kaya–Iloilo. Curran would make his debut for the Lions on 8 March in an AFC Champions League game against Australian side Sydney FC.

BG Pathum United 
Curran would return to Thai football after signing with Thai League 1 side BG Pathum United. He would make his debut for the Rabbits in the 2022 Thailand Champions Cup, where Pathum would beat Buriram United to win the silverware. Curran would score his first goal for Pathum in a league win over former club Muangthong United.

Loan to Chonburi 
On 5 December 2022, Curran joined fellow Thai League 1 side Chonburi on loan until the end of the season. Curran would score two goals in his debut for Chonburi on 22 January 2023 in a 5–3 league win over Police Tero.

International career
Curran is eligible to play for the national teams of Australia, Scotland and Philippines.

In September 2018, Australia coach Graham Arnold (who had coached Curran at Central Coast Mariners) watched Curran play for Dundee, as a potential selection for the 2019 AFC Asian Cup.

Philippines
Two months later, he was contacted by Philippines coach Sven-Goran Eriksson in relation to representing the team internationally. He made an unofficial appearance for the Azkals, coming in as a substitute during the Azkals' friendly 3-1 win over Chaint Hornbill.

Curran was included in the 25-man squad of the Philippines for 2022 FAS Tri-Nations Series. He debuted in a 2–0 loss to Singapore on 29 March 2022.

Career statistics

Honours

Club
BG Pathum United
 Thailand Champions Cup: 2022

See also
 List of foreign Scottish Premiership players

References

External links
 Jesse Curran profile DundeeFC.co.uk
 
 
 Jesse Curran at EnglishUDFC.com

1996 births
Living people
Association football midfielders
Australian soccer players
Australian people of Scottish descent
Australian people of Filipino descent
Australian sportspeople of Asian descent
Sportspeople of Filipino descent
Citizens of the Philippines through descent
Central Coast Mariners FC players
Central Coast Mariners Academy players
Dundee F.C. players
Montrose F.C. players
East Fife F.C. players
Jesse Curran
National Premier Leagues players
Scottish Professional Football League players
Sportsmen from Tasmania
Soccer players from Tasmania
Expatriate footballers in Scotland
Australian expatriate soccer players
Australian expatriate sportspeople in Scotland
Jesse Curran
Philippines Football League players
Kaya F.C. players
Jesse Curran
Philippines international footballers
Jesse Curran